Odetta's discography is large and diverse, covering over 50 years and many record labels. 

** denotes Grammy nomination.
*** denotes Grammy Winner

Studio albums
 1954 The Tin Angel (with Larry Mohr)
 1956 Odetta Sings Ballads and Blues  Tradition TLP1010
 1957 At the Gate of Horn  Tradition TLP1025
 1959 My Eyes Have Seen  Vanguard VSD2046
 1960 Ballad For Americans and Other American Ballads  Vanguard VSD2057
 1960 Christmas Spirituals  Vanguard VSD2079
 1962 Odetta and The Blues  Riverside RLP9417
 1962 Sometimes I Feel Like Cryin'  RCA Victor LSP-2573
 1963 One Grain of Sand  Vanguard VSD2153
 1963 Odetta Sings Folk Songs  RCA Victor LSP-2643
 1964 It's a Mighty World  RCA Victor LSP-2792
 1964 Odetta Sings of Many Things  RCA Victor LSP-2923
 1965 Odetta Sings Dylan  RCA Victor LSP-3324
 1967 Odetta  FTS3014
 1970 Odetta Sings Polydor
 1988 Christmas Spirituals (new recording)  ALC104
 1999 Blues Everywhere I Go **  MC0038
 2001 Looking For a Home

Live albums
 1960 Odetta at Carnegie Hall Vanguard VSD2072 
 1962 Town Hall Vanguard VSD2109
 1966 Odetta in Japan  RCA LSP3457
 1973 The Essential Odetta
This album is a combination of the Carnegie Hall & Town Hall albums
 1976 It's Impossible, a.k.a. Odetta at the Best of Harlem
 1998 To Ella
Also released as Odetta & American Folk Pioneer
 2002 Women in (E)motion
 2005 Gonna Let It Shine **

Compilation albums
 1963 Odetta
 1967 The Best of Odetta
 1968 Odetta Sings The Blues Riverside RS 3007
 1973 The Essential Odetta (live)
This album is a combination of the Carnegie Hall & Town Hall albums
 1987 Movin' It On  RQ101
 1994 The Best of Odetta: Ballads and Blues
 1999 The Best of the Vanguard Years
 2000 Livin' with the Blues
 2000 Absolutely the Best
 2002 The Tradition Masters
 2003 American Folk Pioneer (This album is a re-issue of To Ella)
 2006 Best of the M.C. Records Years 1999-2005
 2007 Vanguard Visionaries

Appearances
 1959 Newport Folk Festival
 1960 Belafonte Returns to Carnegie Hall (Harry Belafonte)
Tracks: "I've Been Driving On Bald Mountain", "Water Boy", "There's a hole in the bucket"
 1960 Folk Festival At Newport Vol. 2
 1962 Folk Song and Minstrelsy
 1963 Jimmy Witherspoon
Track: duet on "Lonesome Road."
 1964 We Shall Overcome: The March on Washington
Tracks: "Freedom Trilogy": "I'm on My Way", "Come and Go with Me" & "Oh Freedom".
 1968 A Tribute To Woodie Guthrie Vol. 1
Track: "This Land Is Your Land/Narration" (with Arlo Guthrie & co. and Will Geer)
 1969 The Original Hits Of Right Now Plus Some Heavies From The Motion Picture "Easy Rider"
Track: "Ballad of Easy Rider"
 1970 A Tribute To Woodie Guthrie Vol. 2, "Pastures of Plenty"
 1972 Greatest Songs of Woody Guthrie
 1976 Aftertones (Janis Ian)
 1987 Songs of the Working People
 1987 Greatest Folksingers of the 'Sixties
Track: "John Henry"
 1988 Greenwich Folk Festival
 1993 Other Voices, Other Rooms (Nanci Griffith) **
 1993 Rare, Live and Classic (Joan Baez)
 1994 Freedom is a Constant Struggle
 1995 Scenes from a Scene: Greenwich Village
 1995 A Folksinger's Christmas
 1995 Assassins in the Kingdom (Michael Jonathan)
 1996 At Home/Around the World (David Amram & Friends)
 1997 Mojo Club: V.4 Light My Fire
 1998 Other Voices TOO (Nanci Griffith)
 1998 Miriam McKeba-Odetta (Harry Belafonte)
 1998 Giants of Folk: Leadbelly/Guthrie/Odetta
 1998 Where Have All the Flowers Gone
 1998 Original Seeds: Songs that Inspired Nick Cave
 1998 Folk Hits of the 1960s
 2000 Sounds of a Better World
 2000 The Ballad of Ramblin' Jack **
 2000 Hyacinths and Thistles (the 6ths)
Track: "Waltzing Me All The Way Home"
 2000 Women of Silverworlf
 2000 Rollin' Into Memphis: Songs of John Hiatt
 2000 Gospel
 2000 Route 50: Driving New Routes
 2000 Queens of the Blues
 2001 Roger McGuinn: Treasures from the Folk Den **
 2001 Washington Square Memories
 2001 Jazz Ladies
 2001 Say Yo' Business
 2001 Philadelphia Folk Festival: 40th Anniversary
 2001 Say It Out Loud
 2001 Folk Music
 2001 Sounds of a Better World (Small Voices Calling)
 2002 Blues Treasures
 2002 This Land Is Your Land
 2002 Soul & Inspiration
 2003 Broken Hearted Blues
 2003 Blues Had a Baby & It's Rock 'n Roll
 2003 In the Wind
 2003 Beginner's Guide to Folk Music
 2003 Seeds: The Songs of Pete Seeger
 2003 Respond II
 2003 The Prestige Blues Sampler
 2003 Corner of Bleeker and Blues
 2003 Best of M.C. Records 1996-2002
 2003 Let Freedom Sing
 2003 Best of Kerrville Festival
 2003 Patriot's Songbook
 2003 Blue Box of Blues
 2003 Shout Sister Shout: Rosetta Tharpe Tribute
 2004 Baby Don't Tear My Clothes (James Cotton)
 2004 Ladies Man (Pinetop Perkins) **
 2004 My Country Awake: Freedom Compilation
 2004 Eric Bibb & Friends
 2004 Salute to the Blues: Listening in the Bottle
 2005 Folk: The Life, Times & Music Series

Tribute Albums
 Beautiful Star: The Songs Of Odetta, by Wears The Trousers Records
 Requiem for a Heavyweight (Tribute to Odetta), by Sista Jean & CB

References

[ Discography] at Allmusic
Discography at Discogs.com

 
Odetta
Rhythm and blues discographies
Blues discographies
Folk music discographies